William IV of Jülich-Berg (9 January 1455 – 6 September 1511) was the last ruler of the Duchy of Jülich-Berg.

Life 
William was the son of Gerhard VII, Duke of Jülich-Berg and Sophie of Saxe-Lauenburg. When his father died in 1475, William became Duke of Jülich-Berg.

He married the rich Countess Elisabeth of Nassau-Saarbrücken in 1472, but she died in 1479. In 1481, William remarried with Sibylle of Brandenburg, daughter of Albert III Achilles, Elector of Brandenburg. Neither marriage produced a son, so the succession of the Duchy became a problem.

William then concluded in 1496 the Klever Union with John II, Duke of Cleves, in which the union of the Duchy of Jülich-Berg and the Duchy of Cleves-Mark was planned. William had only one five-year-old daughter, Maria, who was promised in marriage to John II's six-year-old son John III.
They married in 1509.

William died in 1511, leaving his daughter the final member of the House of Jülich. He is buried in Altenberg Abbey. He was succeeded by his son-in-law, who inherited the Duchy of Cleves-Mark in 1521.  John III then became the first ruler of the United Duchies of Jülich-Cleves-Berg, which would exist until 1666.

Ancestors

References 
 Hansjörg Laute: Die Herrn von Berge. Auf den Spuren der Geschichte des Bergischen Landes (1101–1806). Boll, Solingen 1988,

External links 
Mittelalterliche Genealogie (in German)

1455 births
1511 deaths
Counts of Ravensberg
Dukes of Berg